State Route 231 (SR 231) is an unsigned state highway in Elko County, Nevada, United States. Known as Angel Lake Road, the highway connects Angel Lake to the town of Wells. SR 231 is a Nevada Scenic Byway.

Route description
SR 231 begins at the Angel Lake fee booth, providing access to the lake and nearby picnic and campground areas. From there, the highway heads in a general eastward direction, descending through switchbacks along the east side of the East Humboldt Range. The final  sees the route turn more directly eastward to enter the town of Wells. SR 231 comes to its northern terminus at the intersection of Angel Lake Road and Humboldt Avenue (SR 223) in Wells, just south of Interstate 80. Angel Lake Road may be closed to travel during winters.

History

Angel Lake Road became a state highway on July 1, 1976.

State Route 231 was designated a Nevada Scenic Byway on June 30, 1995.

Major intersections

See also

References

External links

Nevada Department of Transportation - Angel Lake Photo Gallery

East Humboldt Range
231
231
Transportation in Elko County, Nevada